Annick Anthoine (born 21 November 1945) is a French rower. She competed in the women's single sculls event at the 1976 Summer Olympics.

References

External links

1945 births
Living people
French female rowers
Olympic rowers of France
Rowers at the 1976 Summer Olympics
Place of birth missing (living people)